Anne Stuart may refer to:

16th century
Anne, Countess of Auvergne (1496–1524), married James Stewart, duke of Albany
Anne of Denmark (1574–1619), wife of James I of Great Britain (VI of Scotland)

17th century
Anne Stuart (born 1637), daughter of Charles I of Great Britain
Anne Hyde (1638–1671), married name Anne Stuart, wife of James II of Great Britain (VII of Scotland) and mother of Mary II and Queen Anne
Anne, Queen of Great Britain (1665–1714)

18th century
Anne Stuart Percy, Lady Warkworth (  1745–1813)

20th century
Anne Mackenzie-Stuart (1930–2008), activist
Anne Stuart (novelist) (born 1948), American romance novelist
Ann Stuart, chancellor and president of Texas Woman's University

See also
Amelia Stewart, Viscountess Castlereagh (1772–1829), member of Regency London high society
Anna Stewart (disambiguation)